Kongsak Vantana (born 30 July 1945) is a former Thai air force officer. He served as commander-in-chief of the Royal Thai Air Force from 2002 to 2005.

In December 2003, he received Singapore's Meritorious Service Medal (Military) award.

References 

Living people
1945 births
Place of birth missing (living people)
Kongsak Vantana
Kongsak Vantana